Each year, an In Memoriam tribute, which honors distinguished members of the Academy of Motion Picture Arts and Sciences who died during the previous year, is included during the televised presentation of the Academy Awards. Listed below are those who were honored on February 22, 2009, at the Kodak Theatre in Los Angeles, California, during the 81st Academy Awards tribute.

Paul Newman, who appeared last, is considered to be the featured tribute.  At the conclusion of the musical accompaniment, a short dialogue by Paul Newman ended the tribute.  The Newman dialogue concluded the tribute with the following quote: "The big difference between people is not between the rich and the poor, the good and the evil. The biggest of all differences between people is between those who have had pleasure in love and those who haven't." —Paul Newman as Chance Wayne in Sweet Bird of Youth.

Controversies
During the 81st Academy Awards, which was hosted by the Academy of Motion Picture Arts and Sciences, Queen Latifah was the presenter and a performer for the annual In Memoriam tribute.  This was controversial because traditionally the segment is accompanied by instrumental music and displayed without vocal music accompaniment.  Live music has previously accompanied the tribute however; and cellist Yo-Yo Ma did so during the 77th Academy Awards - although his performance was solely instrumental.  Latifah sang "I'll Be Seeing You" from the Broadway musical Right This Way during the 81st Academy Awards tribute to honor individuals who had died since the previous year's Academy Award ceremonies. The controversy of the performance was compounded by the visual display from a camera panning around the stage at a distance, leaving television viewers unable to see and read a number of different names/pictures on the large screen at the back of the stage.

There were plans to attempt to dampen the audience applause during the tribute that included cutting the audio feed from the theatre.  This effort was intended to disguise audience preferences for certain deceased honorees over others.  Some industry insiders speculate that Latifah's performance was a successful effort to minimize audience applause during the tribute.

The tribute had a second break from tradition. Ten years ago when Gene Siskel was omitted from the tribute because as a film critic he was not a member of the academy, host Whoopi Goldberg ad libbed his tribute, which concluded with her giving a thumbs-up at the ceiling (i.e., heaven). The 81st Academy Awards' tribute included film critic Manny Farber. However, the tribute did not go so far as to include the recently deceased movie trailer voice acting specialist Don LaFontaine.

2009 Ceremony Honoree list

Explanations
During the tribute, an incorrect photograph of Kon Ichikawa was included.  This necessitated a formal apology by the Academy of Motion Picture Arts and Sciences, which they have posted on their Oscar.org website.  Maila Nurmi was included, although her death occurred in the prior February 1 – January 31 period, while James Whitmore was included although his death occurred after it. The Academy of Motion Picture Arts and Sciences compiles a list of those eligible for next years tribute based on having died after the annual February 1 cutoff.

Several past Academy Award nominees and winners were not included in the tribute.  Many of those excluded were nominated writers: Irving Brecher – 1944 Writing (Screenplay) – Meet Me in St. Louis, Malvin Wald – 1948 Writing (Motion Picture Story) – The Naked City, Oscar Brodney – 1954 Writing (Story and Screenplay) – The Glenn Miller Story,  Fred Haines – 1967 Writing (Screenplay based on material from another medium) – Ulysses, Donald E. Westlake – 1990 Writing (Screenplay based on material from another medium) – The Grifters.  David Lee, a one-time winner for Sound in 2002 Chicago, was omitted.  Two-time Music (Scoring: Original Song Score and Adaptation) nominee, Angela Morley, for 1974 – The Little Prince and 1977 – The Slipper and the Rose--The Story of Cinderella and two-time Documentary (Feature) nominee, Alex Grasshoff, for 1966 – The Really Big Family and 1973 – Journey to the Outer Limits were not included. Two Scientific or Technical Award (Class II) winners were omitted: Edward Efron – 1972 and James L. Wassell – 1962. Several other past one-time nominees were omitted: Howard G. Minsky – 1970 Best Picture – Love Story, J.C. Melendez – 1970 Music (Original Song Score) – A Boy Named Charlie Brown, Jonathan Bates – 1982 Sound – Gandhi, Edmund F. Penney – 1973 Documentary (Feature) – Walls of Fire,  Maury Winetrobe – 1968 Film Editing – Funny Girl

Several other notable individuals, including George Carlin (six-time Emmy Award nominee), Bernie Brillstein (nine-time Emmy Award nominee), Neal Hefti (Emmy Award nominee) Beverly Garland (Emmy Award nominee), Estelle Getty (Emmy Award and Golden Globe Award winner), Eartha Kitt (Emmy Award nominee), Harvey Korman (four-time Emmy winner, Golden Globe Award winner), John Phillip Law (Golden Globe Award nominee), and Patrick McGoohan (two-time Emmy Award winner, BAFTA TV Award winner), were not included in the "In Memoriam" tribute, though they died within the   year.  Heath Ledger died shortly before the previous year's ceremony, and a tribute to him was included then.

Notes

^
In Memoriam 81
2009 in American cinema
Death-related lists